Khuhro is a Sindhi tribe in Sindh and Balochistan, Pakistan. Khuhros belong to the Abro clan of the Sammas. According to tradition the Khuhro settled in the fertile tract near the Indus River around the modern Larkana District and Khairpur District.

The Khuhro tribe is found in approx thirty three villages (Larkana, Beda, Satabo, Gambat (Actor Awais Khan Official and Yaseen khan khuhro also belongs to Gambat), Sobhodero, Khuhra City, Faqeer mill, Ranipur, Bindi Motayo, baghe ja ban, Nandhi Bindi, Madd, Danghurae, Khohae, Gharae, Dosani, Mulae, Lorhae, Jado Wahan, Mehro wahan, Ambani, Motani/Muhammad Motial where Mr Tariq And Safiullah Khan Khuhro is still alive, Munawarabad, Hajji Soof, Agra, Ghuhram khuhro, Bahram khuhro, Muhammad jo wahan, Belharo, Khooh, Satabo, Lundae khuhra, Mulan ja Pidd, Dilawar khuhro Gouth Rj Sidra muskan of Jeay Larkana FM 88.8 also belongs to this village, Saghiyoon, Badal, Kechhee of the Gambat taluk & Sobhodero Taluka, Khairpur District.

Notable people 

Muhammad Ayub Khuhro, Pakistan Defence Minister and three times Chief Minister of Sindh
Hamida Khuhro, a politician and academic; a daughter of Muhammad Ayub Khuhro
Nisar Khuhro, former speaker Sindh assembly

References 

Sindhi tribes